Ihor Oleksandrovych Zhdanov (29 December 1967 in Vinnytsia) is a Ukrainian politician who was the Minister of Youth and Sports in the Yatsenyuk Government and in the Groysman Government. Zhdanov is the president of the Open Politics analytical center.

Biography
He was elected into the Ukrainian Parliament in 2014 as a member of the Fatherland party. When Fatherland left the Yatsenyuk Government on 17 February 2016 Zhdanov refused to resign and hence was expelled from Fatherland. He retained his post in the Groysman Government (installed on 14 April 2016). He stayed on has minister until on 29 August 2019 the Honcharuk government was installed.

References

 	 

1967 births
Living people
Politicians from Vinnytsia
Taras Shevchenko National University of Kyiv alumni
Ukrainian political scientists
Eighth convocation members of the Verkhovna Rada
Youth and sport ministers of Ukraine
Our Ukraine (political party) politicians
All-Ukrainian Union "Fatherland" politicians
People's Front (Ukraine) politicians
People of the Euromaidan